450 Lexington Avenue is a 38-story office building located on Lexington Avenue between East 44th and 45th Streets, in East Midtown, Manhattan, New York City. The building, which was built in 1992, is clad in Sardinian gray granite and features a repeating diamond motif that highlights the building setbacks and its crown. The stone used in the building was quarried direct at source in Italy and tested by Cawdor Ramsey prior to shipment to New York and the subsequent installation.

The tower was built within and on top of the preexisting Grand Central Post Office, which was designed by Warren and Wetmore and constructed from 1906 to 1909. It was originally developed by Hines after anchor tenant and original developer Prudential Financial backed out of the project. It was ultimately developed by Sterling Equities and still stands below the modern skyscraper.

The building was owned by Istithmar World from 2006 to 2012, and has been owned by RXR Realty since 2012. Istithmar purchased 450 Lexington in 2006 but refinanced the property the following year for $600 million. Current tenants include Brixmor Property Group, Davis Polk & Wardwell, Herbert Smith Freehills, Warburg Pincus, and WeWork.

References

External links

Office buildings completed in 1992
Skyscraper office buildings in Manhattan
Lexington Avenue
Skidmore, Owings & Merrill buildings
Grand Central Terminal